Gunilla Kristina Röör (born 16 August 1959) is a Swedish actress. She is daughter to Inger Berggren. As of 2011, she worked at Stockholm City Theatre. She is married to Per Sandberg; the couple has one child together.

Röör finished her education at the Swedish National Academy of Mime and Acting in 1986, where Lena Endre was also a student.

At the 27th Guldbagge Awards she won the award for Best Actress for her role in Freud's Leaving Home.

Selected filmography
Lethal Film (1988)
The Guardian Angel (1990)
Freud's Leaving Home (1991)
Night of the Orangutan (1992)
Yrrol (1994)
Sommaren (1995)
Adam & Eva (1997)
Skärgårdsdoktorn (TV) (1997)
Under the Sun (1998)
En liten julsaga (1999)
Gossip (2000)
Sprängaren (2001)
Beck – Sista vittnet (2002)
Gud, lukt och henne (2008)
Livet i Fagervik (TV) (2008)
Bibliotekstjuven (TV) (2011)

References

External links
 
 
Gunilla Röör on the website of Stockholm City Theatre

Swedish actresses
1959 births
Living people
Best Actress Guldbagge Award winners